Bernard Salomon, (1506–1561) was a French painter, draftsman and engraver.

Little is known of the life of Bernard Salomon (also known as the Little Bernard B. Gallus or Gallo). His family may have been belt-makers in Lyon. He was commissioned to provide decorations for Ippolito II d'Este in 1540, Henry II of France in 1548, and Jacques Dalbon, Seigneur de Saint Andre in 1550. He worked closely with the printer Jean de Tournes to design, engrave, and illustrate many types of books such as emblem books, documentaries and scientific works, and literary works, including the Bible and Ovid's Metamorphoses (Lyon, Tournes, 1557). Salomon's figures were inspired by the elegant Mannerist art of the School of Fontainebleau, and were inspiration for engravers working in Lyon and became widely distributed and copied. He had a daughter who married the printer Robert Granjon.

He is sometimes referred to as "'Petit", alluding to the intricate detail Salomon works into his designs at small scale.

References

 Peter Sharratt, Bernard Solomon, illustrator Lyonnais al. "Works of Humanism and Renaissance", Geneva, Droz, 2005 with 259 illustrations
 Philippe Hoch, "Bernard Solomon Lyon illustrator" BBF, 2006, No. 2, p. 108-109

1506 births
1561 deaths
16th-century French painters
French male painters
Artists from Lyon
French draughtsmen
Engravers from Lyon